Light Blue Line may refer to:

Transportation 

 Inner West & Leppington Line, Australia
 East Rail line, Hong Kong
 Nankō Port Town Line, Osaka, Japan
 Filyovskaya line, Moscow, Russia
 Seoul Subway Line 4, South Korea
 Line 1 (Madrid Metro), Spain
 Light Blue Line (Bangkok), Thailand
 Victoria line, London, United Kingdom 
 E Line (Los Angeles Metro), California, United States
 K Ingleside in San Francisco, California, United States
 Paris Métro Line 13, Paris, France

See also
 Blue Line (disambiguation)
 Turquoise Line (disambiguation)